Gjergji is both a surname and a given name, derived from the Greek Georgios (Γεώργιος). It is commonly used by Albanian Christians. The name was popularised amongst Albanians by Saint George. Notable people with the name include:

Surname
Andromaqi Gjergji (1928–2015), Albanian ethnologist
Dodë Gjergji (born 1963), Albanian Roman Catholic bishop
Helidon Gjergji (born 1970), Albanian artist
Matilda Gjergji (born 2003), Albanian footballer

Given name
Gjergji Dëma (born 1971), Albanian footballer
Gjergji Muzaka (born 1984), Albanian footballer
Gjergji Papa, Albanian politician

See also
Gjergj (disambiguation)

Albanian masculine given names
Albanian-language surnames
Patronymic surnames
Surnames from given names